Tubreh Riz may refer to:
 Tubreh Riz, Kermanshah
 Tubreh Riz, Dehgolan, Kurdistan Province
 Tubreh Riz, Kamyaran, Kurdistan Province